The Lotus T125, also known as the Lotus Exos, is a Formula One-shaped single seater open-wheel sports car produced by Lotus Cars. Lotus planned on producing 25 units, but only 10 have been produced. The T125 appeared on Top Gear in July 2011, driven by Jeremy Clarkson. The T125 is also known as the Exos, which is a reference to the exosphere.

The project was a failure, with only a few cars built and delivered. The project was sold to a New Zealand-based company called Rodin Cars. Rodin Cars took the T125 and improved upon it, adding its own components such as a new titanium exhaust, titanium steering wheel and composite seats. It has been renamed as the Rodin FZED and is priced at $650,000.

A T125 was donated to the non profit Genius Garage in October 2021.  Genius Garage helps young people get hands on experience with real life engineering projects to help them get a job in the engineering industry.

References

Lotus vehicles
Sports cars
Cars introduced in 2010